Wayne Geoffrey Graham (born 13 April 1957) is a former New Zealand rugby union player. A number 8 and flanker, Graham represented Otago at a provincial level, and was a member of the New Zealand national side, the All Blacks, in 1978 and 1979. He played eight matches for the All Blacks including one international.

References

1957 births
Living people
Rugby union players from Tauranga
People educated at Tauranga Boys' College
University of Otago alumni
New Zealand rugby union players
New Zealand international rugby union players
Otago rugby union players
Rugby union number eights
Rugby union flankers